The discography of British N-Dubz singer Tulisa consists of one studio album, seven singles and six music videos.

Tulisa's solo career began on 29 April 2012, when she released the first solo single from her debut solo album  "Young". The single was released as part of a remixes EP, which charted at number 5 on the Irish Singles Chart and hit the top spot at number 1 on the UK Singles Chart.
On 9 September 2012, Tulisa released her second solo single "Live It Up", which features guest vocals from American rapper Tyga. The single debuted at number 11 in the UK. Tulisa released her third and final single from the album, "Sight of You" on 2 December 2012 and charted at number 18 in the UK. On 3 December 2012, she released her debut solo album The Female Boss which peaked at number 35 on the UK Albums Chart but failed to chart in the top 40 in Ireland.

On 20 October 2014, nearly two years after her last single release, Tulisa premiered "Living Without You", the lead single from her second album. The single was set to be released 7 December 2014, before getting pushed back to 15 December 2014. The single then got pushed back a third time and was released on 4 January 2015. "Living Without You", peaked at number 44 on the UK Singles Chart but failed to chart on the Irish Singles Chart. In 2014, Tulisa announced that she would have to have had released at least four hit singles before releasing a second solo album. In 2016, Tulisa featured on the underground club DJ Carnao Beats track "Love You for Tonight" which became an urban club smash. Tulisa's most recent solo single, "Sweet Like Chocolate", was released on 2 September 2016 and sampled the chorus of the Shanks & Bigfoot track of the same name. The single failed to chart.

Albums

Singles

As lead artist

As featured artist

Promotional singles

Guest appearances

Music videos

References

Pop music discographies